Shlomi Ben Hemo (born 5 December 1978) is an Israeli footballer.

References

External links
 

1978 births
Living people
Israeli footballers
Hapoel Rishon LeZion F.C. players
Hapoel Ashkelon F.C. players
Hapoel Petah Tikva F.C. players
Sektzia Ness Ziona F.C. players
Hapoel Kfar Saba F.C. players
Hapoel Be'er Sheva F.C. players
Hapoel Azor F.C. players
Liga Leumit players
Israeli Premier League players
Footballers from Rishon LeZion
Israeli people of Moroccan-Jewish descent
Association football goalkeepers